Francesco is a 1989 historical drama film about the life of St. Francis of Assisi. It is directed and co-written by Liliana Cavani, and stars Mickey Rourke as Francis and Helena Bonham Carter as the future St. Claire. The screenplay is adapted from Hermann Hesse’s 1904 book Francis of Assisi. Vangelis composed the musical score.

The film won three awards and was nominated for a fourth. Danilo Donati won the 1989 David di Donatello Award for Best Production Design, and the 1989 Italian National Syndicate of Film Journalists Silver Ribbon also for Best Production Design. Fabio Bussotti won the Syndicate's Best Supporting Actor Award. Director Liliana Cavani was nominated for the Golden Palm at the 1989 Cannes Film Festival.

The film is the second of three works by Cavani about St. Francis, preceded by a 1966 telefilm starring Lou Castel in the title role, and a 2014 production with Mateusz Kościukiewicz.

Plot
Through flashbacks, the film charts Francis's evolution from rich man's son to religious humanitarian and finally to full-fledged saint.

Raised as the pampered son of a merchant, Francis goes off to war, only to return with a profound horror for the society which generated such suffering. In one scene, as an act of renunciation, he strips himself of his fine clothing in front of his father, and leaves the house naked and barefoot, joining the lepers and beggars in the poor section of town. A series of episodes from Francis' life follows, rather than a coherent narrative, until his final days when he receives the stigmata, the wounds Christ suffered at the crucifixion.

Cast
 Mickey Rourke - Francesco
 Helena Bonham Carter - Chiara
 Andréa Ferréol - Francesco's Mother (as Andrea Ferreol)
 Nikolaus Dutsch - Cardinal Colonna
 Peter Berling - Bishop Guido
 Hanns Zischler - Pope Innocent III
 Mario Adorf - Cardinal Ugolino
 Paolo Bonacelli - Francesco's Father
 Fabio Bussotti - Leone
 Riccardo De Torrebruna - Pietro Cattani
 Alexander Dubin - Angelo (as Alekander Dubin)
 Edward Farrelly - Egidio
 Paolo Proietti - Pacifico
 Paco Reconti - Rufino
 Diego Ribon - Bernardo di Quintavalle
Domiziano Arcangeli - Brother in Lateran Palace

Soundtrack
The soundtrack of the film was composed by the Greek composer Vangelis. It was never officially issued, but released in a limited edition not licensed for public by Andromeda Music (AMO103) in 2002.

See also
 List of historical drama films

References

External links

Filmografia di Liliana Cavani

1989 films
1989 drama films
English-language Italian films
1980s Italian-language films
Films directed by Liliana Cavani
Italian drama films
Cultural depictions of Francis of Assisi
Films set in the 13th century
Films set in Italy
Italian biographical films
Films scored by Vangelis
Adaptations of works by Hermann Hesse
1980s Italian films